Muksudpur is an upazila of Gopalganj District in the Division of Dhaka, Bangladesh.

Geography
It has a total area of 309.63 km2.

Demographics

According to the 2011 Bangladesh census, Muksudpur Upazila had 61,807 households and a population of 289,406, 6.8% of whom lived in urban areas. 10.7% of the population was under the age of 5. The literacy rate (age 7 and over) was 52.5%, compared to the national average of 51.8%.

Administration
Muksudpur Upazila is divided into Muksudpur Municipality and 16 union parishads: Bhabrasur, Bahugram, Banshbaria, Batikamari, Dignagar, Gobindapur, Gohala, Jalirpar, Kasalia, Khandarpur, Maharajpur, Mochna, Nanikshir, Pasargati, Raghdi, and Ujani. The union parishads are subdivided into 206 mauzas and 255 villages.

Muksudpur Municipality is subdivided into 9 wards and 15 mahallas.

Chairman: Kabir Mia

Vice Chairman: Rabiul Islam

Woman Vice Chairman: Taposhi Biswas Durga

Economy
Muksudpur's economic is mostly based on farming and fishing.

Birds and fish
The most common birds of the upazilla include doel, salik, crow and duck. On the other hand, in the river, canal, beels, and ponds there are various kinds of fish like Shol, Gozar, Koi, Puti, Shing etc.

Notable people
 Faruk Khan – politician, MP
 Shakib Khan - Bangladeshi film actor, producer and singer

References

Upazilas of Gopalganj District, Bangladesh